Angela Chalmers (born September 6, 1963) is a Canadian retired track and field athlete who competed in the 1500 metres and 3000 metres. She is the 1992 Olympic bronze medallist in the 3000 metres, and a three-time Commonwealth gold medallist, winning the 1500m and 3000m in 1990, and the 3000m in 1994.

Career
Born in Brandon, Manitoba, Canada, Chalmers was always an avid runner. She competed with the Canadian National Jr. Track Team, eventually receiving a scholarship to Northern Arizona University. Chalmers first appeared on the international stage in 1985 in Kobe, Japan at the Universiade, where she finished third in the 3,000 metres. The following year in Arizona, she won the NCAA Division I Cross Country Championships for Northern Arizona University. She won the Honda Sports Award as the nation's best female collegiate cross country runner in 1987. This was followed in 1987 with a second place at the Pan American Games in the 3000 meters, in Indianapolis. She finished 14th in the 3000 metres final at the 1988 Seoul Olympics.

In the year 1990, Chalmers won two Commonwealth Games titles in Auckland, New Zealand, winning both the 1500 meter race and the 3000 meter race in a World leading time of 8:38.38.  In 1992, she qualified for the Olympics in the cross-country event. even though her father had died in 1984 before the Olympic trials she thought of him while she ran her race. after the race, in which she finished third (behind Yelena Romanova and Tatyana Dorovskikh) and qualified for the bronze medal, she explained to reporters about her father, "I said to him when he was in the hospital that I wanted to prove to him that I could do it".

She was chosen by her team to be the flag bearer at the opening ceremonies of the 1994 Commonwealth games, leading her team into Centennial Stadium. In 1994 in Victoria, Canada, she retained her Commonwealth 3000 m title in a personal best time of 8:32.17, placing her third on the 1994 World rankings (she did not compete in the 1500 meters). She remains the only woman in the history of the Commonwealth Games to successfully defend the 3000 m race. On September 3, 1994, she won the Grand Prix Final of the Women's 1500 meters held in France with a personal best time of 4:01.61. At the height of her career, Chalmers was ranked as one of the top three middle distance runners in the world.

In 2001, Chalmers was inducted into the Manitoba Sports Hall of Fame and Museum, and in 2004 into the BC Sports Hall of Fame. She was a recipient of the National Aboriginal Achievement Award, now the Indspire Awards, in the sports category in 1995. In addition to her successful career, Chalmers was also a spokeswoman. She is of Sioux descent, and used her platform as a professional runner to speak out about Aboriginal peoples. She was inducted into the Athletics Canada Hall of Fame in 2019. In 2019, she was a member of the inaugural class of the Big Sky Hall of Fame.

In 1996, just before the 1996 Atlanta Olympics, Chalmers retired from her career as a Canadian track and field athlete due to a calf injury.

Chalmers is now married to Simon Doyle, an Australian middle distance runner, and is the mother of two children.

International competitions

References

External links

Angela Chalmers’s biography at Manitoba Sports Hall of Fame and Museum

1963 births
Living people
Canadian female middle-distance runners
Canadian female long-distance runners
Olympic bronze medalists for Canada
Athletes (track and field) at the 1987 Pan American Games
Athletes (track and field) at the 1988 Summer Olympics
Athletes (track and field) at the 1992 Summer Olympics
Athletes (track and field) at the 1990 Commonwealth Games
Athletes (track and field) at the 1994 Commonwealth Games
First Nations sportspeople
Olympic track and field athletes of Canada
Sportspeople from Brandon, Manitoba
Manitoba Sports Hall of Fame inductees
Commonwealth Games medallists in athletics
Medalists at the 1992 Summer Olympics
Commonwealth Games gold medallists for Canada
Pan American Games silver medalists for Canada
Indspire Awards
Olympic bronze medalists in athletics (track and field)
Pan American Games medalists in athletics (track and field)
Universiade medalists in athletics (track and field)
Universiade bronze medalists for Canada
Medalists at the 1985 Summer Universiade
Medalists at the 1987 Pan American Games
Medallists at the 1990 Commonwealth Games
Medallists at the 1994 Commonwealth Games